Augustine-Malvina Blanchecotte or Malvina Blanchecotte(1830–1897) was a  French poet and writer.

Blanchecotte was born on 30 November 1830 in Paris, France. She earned a living as a seamstress and a teacher. She wrote poetry and her first work Rêves et Réalités was published in 1855. Subsequent volumes included Nouvelles poésies in 1861, Impressions d’une femme : pensées, sentiments, portraits in 1868, Les militantes, poésies in 1871, Tablettes d’une femme pendant la Commune in 1872, and Le long de la vie, nouvelles impressions d’une femme in 1875.

In 1888 her poem Les larmes was set to music by Pyotr Ilyich Tchaikovsky.

Blanchecotte died on 21 February 1897 in Paris.

References

External links

1830 births
1897 deaths
Writers from Paris
French women poets
19th-century French poets
19th-century French women writers